The 2013 Southland Conference men's basketball tournament, a part of the 2012–13 NCAA Division I men's basketball season, took place March 13–16, 2013 at the Merrell Center in Katy, Texas The winner of the tournament received the Southland Conference's automatic bid to the 2013 NCAA Tournament.

Format
With the addition of Oral Roberts to the league, and the departures of Texas-Arlington, Texas-San Antonio, and Texas State to the WAC, a new tournament format was used from this year. For the first time in seven years, the Southland did not have divisions for basketball. The tournament bracket still included the top eight regular season finishers, but the first and second seeds received double byes and began play in the semifinal round. The third and fourth seeds earned a single bye directly into the quarterfinals, while the fifth through eighth seeds played in the first round. Texas A&M-Corpus Christi was ineligible for postseason play, and thus could not complete in the tournament.

Stephen F. Austin received the top seed based on tiebreakers. Northwestern State won the tiebreaker over Oral Roberts and received the second double bye. Oral Roberts was the three seed, while Southeastern Louisiana took the four based on conference tiebreakers. Lamar was eliminated from playoffs.

Bracket
 

All times listed are Central

References

Southland Conference men's basketball tournament
Tournament
Southland Conference men's basketball tournament
Southland Conference men's basketball tournament
Sports competitions in Katy, Texas
College basketball tournaments in Texas